Paris By Night 92: Nhạc Yêu Cầu (Music Requests) was filmed on May 10, 2008 and May 11, 2008 at Knott's Berry Farm, California. In an attempt to make the programs more diverse, Thúy Nga had encouraged the fans to send in their requests in the format of video clips.  The requested songs can be done by an individual or a group of people. 

Vietnamese–Belgian singer Quynh Anh made a special appearance singing her signature song "Hello Vietnam" in the show.

In April 2009, Thúy Nga will be filming Paris By Night 96: Nhac Yeu Cau 2.  This is the direct continuation to Paris By Night 92.  The procedure of requesting the songs is similar, except the audience can now send their requests in two methods: letters or video clips.

Trivia 

If a requested song was chosen:

 The video clip would be shown before the performance.
 Thúy Nga would send a free Paris By Night 92 DVD to that particular individual or group that requested the song as a gift.
 Thúy Nga would send two free tickets to see the live show to that particular individual or group that requested the song.
 To ensure the high quality of the video clips, they need to be formatted in Digital Video Tape or in DVD.

Track list

Disc 1

 Trái Tim Lầm Lỡ (Lời Việt: Khúc Lan) & Như là Tình Yêu (Tuấn Khanh) – Hồ Lệ Thu, Như Loan, Thùy Vân
 Dĩ Vãng (Trịnh Nam Sơn) – Minh Tuyết, Bằng Kiều
 Gõ Cửa Trái Tim (Vinh Sử) – Quang Lê, Mai Thiên Vân
 Mắt Thu (Ngô Thụy Miên) & Tuổi Xa Người (Từ CÔng Phụng) – Trần Thái Hòa, Hương Giang 
 Sa Mạc Tình Yêu & Chìa Khóa Tình Yêu – Nguyệt Anh, Ngọc Liên 
 Tình Yêu Ngày Mai – Nguyễn Hưng
 Vọng Cổ Lòng Mẹ – Hương Lan, Hồng Nga 
 Tình Còn Vương Vấn – Trịnh Lam, Quỳnh Vi 
 Tình Đã Lãng Quên – Như Loan, Nguyễn Thắng 
 Không Bao Giờ Quên Anh & Đừng Nói Xa Nhau – Mạnh Quỳnh, Hà Phương 
 Amore Mio – Lưu Bích, Thủy Tiên 
 Mình Ơi! – Cẩm Ly 
 Tình Hoài Hương – Ý Lan, Quang Lê

Disc 2

 Liên Khúc 10 Năm Tình Cũ. 20 Năm Tình Cũ – Thu Phương, Thế Sơn
 Hello Vietnam – Quynh Anh
 Skit: Kỳ Phùng Địch Thủ – Chí Tài, Việt Hương, Kiều Linh, Hoài Tâm 
 Liên Khúc Câu Chuyện Tình Tôi & Nửa Vầng Trăng – Dương Triệu Vũ, Bảo Hân 
 Mãi Mãi Bên Nhau – Tú Quyên, Lương Tùng Quang 
 Liên Khúc Tuổi Học Trò & Trường Cũ Tình Xưa – Mai Thiên Vân, Quỳnh Dung 
 Liên Khúc Dấu Tình Sầu & Lệ Đá – Khánh Ly, Bằng Kiều
 Liên Khúc Bẽ Bàng & Cô Gái Quê – Cẩm Ly, Minh Tuyết, Hà Phương 
 Liên Khúc Nhạc Diệu Hương – Khánh Hà, Quang Dũng
 Đoạn Cuối Cho Cuộc Tình – Hương Thủy, Thế Sơn
 Liên Khúc Ngày Chia Tay & Tiếc Thương – Lưu Việt Hùng, Hồ Lệ Thu 
 Liên Khúc Top Hits – Minh Tuyết, Quỳnh Vi, Tú Quyên, Ngọc Liên, Nguyệt Ánh, Bằng Kiều, Trịnh Lam, Dương Triệu Vũ, Lương Tùng Quang, Nguyễn Thắng

Paris by Night

vi:Paris By Night 92